Ron'Dell Lamaree Carter (born July 3, 1997)  is an American football linebacker who is a free agent. He played college football at James Madison after transferring from Rutgers in 2017.

Early years
Carter attended Long Reach High School. He was a two-way player at defensive end and tight end. As a junior, he received All-Howard County honors at defensive end. As a senior, he received All-Howard County honors at tight end.

He also practiced basketball and competed in the shot put.

College career
Carter accepted a football scholarship from Rutgers University. As a redshirt freshman, he appeared in only 5 games, making 2 tackles and half a sack. He transferred after the season to James Madison University.

As a sophomore, he appeared in all 15 games as a reserve player, tallying 28 tackles (8 for loss), 4 sacks, 4 quarterback hurries and 3 pass breakups. He had 4 tackles against Norfolk State University.

As a junior, he started in all 13 games, collecting 58 tackles (13 or loss), 7.5 sacks, one quarterback hurry, one forced fumble and one fumble recovery. He had 7 tackles (3 for loss) in the season opener against North Carolina State University. He made 10 tackles (one for loss), one forced fumble and one fumble recovery in the FCS Second Round at Colgate University.

As a senior, he started in all 16 games at defensive end, registering 66 tackles, 27 tackles for loss (second in the CAA), 12 sacks (tied for third in school history), 13 quarterback hurries, one pass breakup and one forced fumble. He had 10 tackles (6 for loss) against the College of William & Mary. He made 7 tackles (1.5 for loss) and a half sack in the national championship game against North Dakota State University.

Professional career

Dallas Cowboys
Carter  was signed as an undrafted free agent by the Dallas Cowboys after the 2020 NFL Draft on April 27. He was given a $145,000 guarantee in his contract to convince him to sign with the team. He was switched to a 3-technique defensive tackle during training camp. On September 5, he was waived during final roster cuts and signed to the practice squad the next day.

Indianapolis Colts
On September 30, 2020, the Indianapolis Colts signed Carter off the Cowboys' practice squad. He was declared inactive in the 5 games he spent on the active roster. Carter was waived by the Colts on November 10, 2020.

Dallas Cowboys (second stint)
On November 11, 2020, Carter was claimed off waivers by the Dallas Cowboys. He signed a contract extension with the Cowboys on March 10, 2021. He was waived by the Cowboys on August 30, 2021.

Arizona Cardinals
On September 3, 2021, Carter was signed to the Arizona Cardinals practice squad.

Houston Texans
On December 21, 2021, Carter was signed by the Houston Texans off the Cardinals practice squad. On December 29, the Texans signed Carter to a one-year extension that runs through the 2022 season. On April 25, 2022, the Texans waived Carter.

Arizona Cardinals (second stint)
On April 26, 2022, Carter was claimed off waivers by the Arizona Cardinals. He was waived on May 16.

Pittsburgh Steelers
On August 8, 2022, Carter signed with the Pittsburgh Steelers. He was waived on August 30.

New England Patriots
On October 19, 2022, Carter was signed to the New England Patriots practice squad. He was released on November 1.

References

External links
James Madison Dukes bio

Living people
1997 births
Players of American football from Baltimore
American football defensive ends
James Madison Dukes football players
Dallas Cowboys players
Indianapolis Colts players
Rutgers Scarlet Knights football players
Arizona Cardinals players
Houston Texans players
Pittsburgh Steelers players
New England Patriots players